Daniel "The Rock" Dawson (born 15 October 1977) is an Australian super welterweight kickboxer and boxer, fighting out of Perth, Western Australia.

Boxing career
Daniel Dawson has a boxing record of 40 wins, 5 losses, and 1 draw. Dawson made history in 2013 when he won the World Boxing Foundation light middleweight title; becoming the first man in history to win world titles in Muay Thai, kickboxing and boxing.

Daniel Dawson made his professional boxing debut on 9 November 2002, defeating Michael Kilmurray by seventh-round technical knockout.

He captured his first title when he defeated Frank Marzano by seventh-round technical knockout for the West Australia light middleweight championship.

Kickboxing career

Daniel has had a very successful kickboxing career and has fought in cards from Australia, China, Thailand, Hawaii, New Zealand, United States Japan and has fought under a diverse range of styles including Muay Thai, K-1 and Shoot boxing.  In his career as a Kick-boxer he has fought and beaten some of the Oceania region and Japan's as well as some of the world's best fighters picking up victories against the likes of John Wayne Parr, Sam Soliman, Taishin Kohiruimaki, Kenichi Ogata, Shane Chapman and Jordan Tai.  Daniel was a former two time world champion, having held both the I.S.K.A. and World Muay Thai Association W.M.T.A belts, having defended them a total of seven times.  He has also done well in tournaments being the back to back Judgement Day Oceania eight man tournament winner in 2001 and 2002.
In 2016 Dawson is reportedly returns to Muay Thai.
On 14 October 2016 Dawson fought John Wayne Parr in Perth, Western Australia. On 8 September 2018, he made his debut for ONE Championship, where he lost to Mustapha Haida in the third round at ONE Championship: Beyond the Horizon. On 17 May 2019, Dawson defeated Brown Pinas by split decision at ONE Championship: Enter the Dragon in an alternate bout for the ONE Featherweight Kickboxing World Grand Prix.

Titles

Boxing
World Boxing Foundation
2013 WBF world light middleweight champion
2004 WBF International middleweight champion
Pan Asian Boxing Association
2012 PABA light middleweight champion (2 title defences)
2011 PABA light middleweight champion
2011 PABA Interim light middleweight champion
2009 PABA light middleweight champion
2008 PABA light middleweight champion (3 title defences)
2007 PABA light middleweight champion (1 title defence then vacated due to world title fight)
2004 PABA light middleweight champion (0 title defences – vacated)
World Boxing Association
2011 WBA Pan African light middleweight champion
2008 WBA Pan African light middleweight champion
International Boxing Federation
2009 IBF Pan Pacific light middleweight champion
Australian National Boxing Federation
2004 Australian light middleweight champion
2003 Australian light middleweight champion (0 title defences – moved up in weight)
2003 West Australia light middleweight champion (1 title defence)
World Boxing Organization
2004 WBO Asia Pacific light middleweight champion

Kickboxing
Judgement Day
2003 Judgement Day 3 "Super 8 Eliminator" tournament champion -72 kg
2002 Judgement Day 2 "Super 8 Eliminator" tournament champion -72 kg
World Muay Thai Association
2001 World Muay Thai Association WMTA Kickboxing super welterweight world champion
2001 World Muay Thai Association WMTA Muaythai super welterweight world champion (2 title defences)
International Sport Karate Association
2001 ISKA Muaythai super welterweight world champion (2 title defences)
2000 ISKA Muaythai super welterweight world champion

Kickboxing record

|-
|-  bgcolor="#CCFFCC"
| 2019-05-17 || Win ||align=left| Brown Pinas || ONE Championship: Enter the Dragon || Kallang, Singapore || Decision (Split) || 3 || 3:00
|-
|-  bgcolor="#FFBBBB"
| 2018-09-08 || Loss ||align=left| Mustapha Haida || ONE Championship: Beyond The Horizon || Shanghai, China || KO (Straight Left) || 3 || 2:14
|-
|-  bgcolor="#FFBBBB"
| 2016-10-14 || Loss ||align=left| John Wayne Parr || Origins 8: Dawson vs JWP III || Perth, Western Australia || Decision (Unanimous) || 5 || 3:00 
|-
|-  bgcolor="#FFBBBB"
| 2008-10-24 || Loss ||align=left| Bruce Macfie || No Contest Thai Boxing Challenge '08 || Brisbane, Australia || Decision (Unanimous) || 5 || 3:00 
|-
|-  bgcolor="#FFBBBB"
| 2008-03-03 || Loss ||align=left| Mike Zambidis || No Respect 4 || Melbourne, Australia || Decision (Split) || 5 || 3:00 
|-
! style=background:white colspan=9 |
|-
|-  bgcolor="#CCFFCC"
| 2007-06-22 || Win ||align=left| Bruce Macfie || X-Plosion 16 Super Fights || Gold Coast, Australia || TKO (Ref Stop/3 Knockdowns) || 3 || 
|-
|-  bgcolor="#CCFFCC"
| 2007-03-25 || Win ||align=left| Jordan Tai || K-1 MAX '07 World Elite Showcase || Yokohama, Japan || Decision (Unanimous) || 3 || 3:00  
|-
|-  bgcolor="#FFBBBB"
| 2006-11-03 || Loss ||align=left| Andy Souwer || S-Cup 2006, Semi Final || Tokyo, Japan || Decision (Unanimous) || 3 || 3:00    
|-
|-  bgcolor="#CCFFCC"
| 2006-11-03 || Win ||align=left| Virgil Kalakoda || S-Cup 2006, Quarter Final || Tokyo, Japan || Decision (Unanimous) || 3 || 3:00  
|-
|-  bgcolor="#CCFFCC"
| 2006-03-18 || Win ||align=left| Park Byoung Kyu|| X-Plosion 13 Super Fights || Sydney, Australia || Decision (Unanimous) || 3 || 3:00  
|-
|-  bgcolor="#CCFFCC"
| 2003-11-18 || Win ||align=left| Kojiro || K-1 World MAX 2003 Champions' Challenge || Tokyo, Japan || Decision (Majority) || 3 || 3:00 
|-
|-  bgcolor="#CCFFCC"
| 2003-02-02 || Win ||align=left| Gunther Baelen || Shoot Boxing "S" Of The World Vol.1 || Tokyo, Japan || Decision (Unanimous) || 5 || 3:00  
|-
|-  bgcolor="#CCFFCC"
| 2002-12-15 || Win ||align=left| Ryland Mahoney || X-Plosion Boonchu S-Cup || Gold Coast, Australia || KO || 4 ||  
|-
|-  bgcolor="#CCFFCC"
| 2002-09-00 || Win ||align=left| Jeremy Allen || Judgement Day 3, Final || Melbourne, Australia || 2 Ext.R TKO || 5 || 
|-
! style=background:white colspan=9 |
|-
|-  bgcolor="#CCFFCC"
| 2002-09-00 || Win ||align=left| Warren Elson || Judgement Day 3, Semi Final || Melbourne, Australia || TKO (Kick) || 1 ||  
|-
|-  bgcolor="#CCFFCC"
| 2002-09-00 || Win ||align=left| Hamid Boujaoub || Judgement Day 3, Quarter Final || Melbourne, Australia || TKO (Kicks) || 2 ||  
|-
|-  bgcolor="#FFBBBB"
| 2002-07-07 || Loss ||align=left| Zheng Yuhao ||S-Cup 2002, Semi Final || Yokohama, Japan || TKO (Corner Stop) || 1 || 1:04    
|-
|-  bgcolor="#CCFFCC"
| 2002-07-07 || Win ||align=left| Ryuji Goto|| S-Cup 2002, Quarter Final || Yokohama, Japan || Decision (Unanimous) || 3 || 3:00  
|-
|-  bgcolor="#FFBBBB"
| 2001-11-20 || Loss ||align=left| Hiroyuki Doi || Shoot Boxing: Be a Champ 4th Stage || Tokyo, Japan || Decision (Unanimous) || 3 || 3:00    
|-
|-  bgcolor="#FFBBBB"
| 2002-03-23 || Loss ||align=left| Jongsanan Fairtex || Master Toddy Show @ Stardust Casino || Las Vegas, NV, USA || Decision || 5 || 3:00
|-
|-  bgcolor="#CCFFCC"
| 2001-07-15 || Win ||align=left| Shane Chapman || Judgement Day 2, Final || Melbourne, Australia || TKO || 2 || 
|-
! style=background:white colspan=9 |
|-
|-  bgcolor="#CCFFCC"
| 2001-07-15 || Win ||align=left| Sam Soliman || Judgement Day 2, Semi Final || Melbourne, Australia || Decision || 3 || 3:00  
|-
|-  bgcolor="#CCFFCC"
| 2001-07-15 || Win ||align=left| Andrew Keogh || Judgement Day 2, Quarter Final || Melbourne, Australia || TKO || 2 || 2:15 
|-
|-  bgcolor="#CCFFCC"
| 2001-07-09 || Win ||align=left| Kenichi Ogata || X-Plosion on Jupiter || Gold Coast, Australia || TKO (Corner Stop/Knee to Body) || 3 ||  
|-
! style=background:white colspan=9 |
|-
|-  bgcolor="#CCFFCC"
| 2001-01-12 || Win ||align=left| Taishin Kohiruimaki || Wolf Revolution: 2nd Wave || Japan || Decision (Majority) || 5 || 3:00  
|-
|-  bgcolor="#CCFFCC"
| 2000-02-04 || Win ||align=left| John Wayne Parr || Judgement Day Super 8, Quarter Final || Melbourne, Australia || Ext.R Decision (Unanimous) || 4 || 3:00
|-
! style=background:white colspan=9 |
|-
|-  bgcolor="#FFBBBB"
| 1999-05-23 || Loss ||align=left| John Wayne Parr || X-plosion I || Gold Coast, Australia || Decision (Split) || 3 || 5:00
|-
! style=background:white colspan=9 |
|-
|-
| colspan=9 | Legend:

Professional boxing record

References

External links

Light-middleweight boxers
Australian male kickboxers
Australian Muay Thai practitioners
Welterweight kickboxers
Sportspeople from Perth, Western Australia
1977 births
Living people
Australian male boxers
Australian male writers
ONE Championship kickboxers
Sportsmen from Western Australia